Piancastagnaio is a comune (municipality) in the Province of Siena in the Italian region Tuscany, located about  southeast of Florence and about  southeast of Siena. 

It is located on the Monte Amiata slopes.

The main attractions include the Pieve of Santa Maria Assunta, in Baroque style but existing from before 1188, the Palazzo Bourbon Del Monte and the Rocca Aldobrandesca ("Aldobrandeschi Castle").

References

External links
 Official website

Cities and towns in Tuscany
Castles in Italy